RIL may refer to:

 Radio Interface Layer, a software interface used in a mobile device to communicate via mobile networks
 RDF Inference Language, a means of expressing expert systems rules and queries that operate on RDF models
 Reliance Industries Limited, a corporation in India
 Rice Lane railway station, England; National Rail station code RIL
 Recombinant Inbred Lines, a population derived from multiply inbred strains in order to study complex genetic traits which normally have large variation for a specific trait/traits
 The FAA and IATA identifier for Garfield County Regional Airport in Rifle, Colorado
 Randesund IL

See also 
 Rill